Karen Reynolds  is an Australian biomedical engineer.  She is currently the Deputy Dean of Computer Science, Engineering and Mathematics at Flinders University and a Matthew Flinders Distinguished Professor. Reynolds is the director of the Medical Device Research Institute and founding director of the Medical Device Partnering Program in South Australia, an organisation that facilitates collaboration between researchers, end-users and industry.

Honours and awards

 David Dewhurst Medal, 2016
 Fellow of the Australian Academy of Health & Medical Sciences, 2014
 Medical Technology Association of Australia Outstanding Achievement Award, 2014
 South Australian Scientist of the Year, 2012
 Named in Top 100 Most Influential Engineers in Australia, 2012, 2013 & 2015
 Fellow of the Australian Academy of Technological Sciences & Engineering, 2011
 Australian Professional Engineer of the Year, 2010
 Australian Learning & Teaching Council Citation, 2011

Boards and committees
 Member, Australian Medical Research Advisory Board
 Immediate Past Chair, Biomedical Engineering College, Engineers Australia
 Chair, National Panel for Biomedical Engineering Education and Research, Engineers Australia
 Director, Academy of Technological Sciences & Engineering Board
 Chair, Health and Technology Forum, Academy of Technological Sciences & Engineering
 Member, South Australian Science Council
 Member, Advisory Committee on Medical Devices, Therapeutic Goods Administration
 Member, South Australian Selection Panel for The General Sir John Monash Awards

References

Living people
Australian women scientists
Wikibomb2016
Australian women engineers
Fellows of the Australian Academy of Health and Medical Sciences
Fellows of the Australian Academy of Technological Sciences and Engineering
20th-century Australian engineers
21st-century Australian engineers
Academic staff of Flinders University
20th-century women engineers
21st-century women engineers
Year of birth missing (living people)
20th-century Australian women